Gomenj (also Romanized as Kowmenj and Gowmenj; also known as Gomīn, Gūmeh, and Gūmī) is a village in Zirkuh Rural District, Central District, Zirkuh County, South Khorasan Province, Iran. At the 2006 census, its population was 101, in 30 families.

References 

Populated places in Zirkuh County